A list of Australian literary awards and prizes:

Literature 
 ABC Fiction Award (2005–2009)
 ACT Book of the Year
 ACT Writing and Publishing Awards
 Ada Cambridge Prize
The Age Book of the Year – discontinued after 2012; reinstituted in 2021
Asher Award –  2005–2017
Australian Book Industry Awards
 Australian Literature Society Gold Medal
 The Australian/Vogel Literary Award
 Banjo Awards  –  1974–1997
 Barbara Jefferis Award
 Chief Minister's NT Book Awards, originally Territory Read, from 2009
 Colin Roderick Award
 David Unaipon Award
 Deborah Cass Prize for Writing, established 2015 for writers from a migrant background
Fogarty Literary Award
 Melbourne Prize for Literature 
 Miles Franklin Award
MUD Literary Prize (since 2018)
The Nib Waverley Library Award for Literature (Currently the Mark & Evette Moran Nib Literary Award)
 Ned Kelly Awards
 New South Wales Premier's Literary Awards
 Nita Kibble Literary Award
 Patrick White Award
 Prime Minister's Literary Awards
Queensland Literary Awards (2012–)
 Queensland Premier's Literary Awards (1999–2011)
 S. H. Prior Memorial Prize (1934–1946)
 South Australian Premier's Awards
 Stella Prize
 The Sydney Morning Herald Best Young Australian Novelists award
 T. A. G. Hungerford Award
 Tasmanian Premier's Literary Prizes
 TDK Australian Audio Book Awards (1989–1999)
 Vance Palmer Prize for Fiction
 Victorian Premier's Literary Awards, including:
Victorian Premier's Literary Award for Indigenous Writing
 Western Australian Premier’s Australia-Asia Literary Award
 Western Australian Premier's Book Awards
 Woollahra Digital Literary Award as noted in the list of electronic literature authors, critics, and works
 Viva la Novella
 Voss Literary Prize

Short stories 
 The Age Short Story Award
 Aurealis Awards
 Best Fantasy Short Story
 Best Horror Short Story
 Best Science Fiction Short Story
 Best Young-Adult Short Story
 Elizabeth Jolley Short Story Prize

Poetry 
ACU Prize for Poetry 
ACT Writing and Publishing Awards
 Anne Elder Award
 Bruce Dawe National Poetry Prize
 The Blake Poetry Prize
 Christopher Brennan Award
 C. J. Dennis Prize for Poetry
 Grace Leven Prize for Poetry
 Griffith University Josephine Ulrick Poetry Prize
 Gwen Harwood Poetry Prize
Helen Anne Bell Poetry Bequest Award
 Ipswich Poetry Feast
 Judith Wright Calanthe Award
 Judith Wright Prize
 Kenneth Slessor Prize for Poetry
 Mary Gilmore Award
 Newcastle Poetry Prize
Noel Rowe Poetry Award
 Peter Porter Poetry Prize
 Philip Hodgins Memorial Medal
 Queen's Gold Medal for Poetry
 The Roland Robinson Literary Award
 Thomas Shapcott Poetry Prize
 Val Vallis Award
 The Vincent Buckley Poetry Prize

Plays
 Patrick White Playwrights' Award (2000–)
 Philip Parsons Young Playwrights Award (1995–2012), renamed NSW Philip Parsons Fellowship for Emerging Playwrights (2013–2018)
 Queensland Premier's Drama Award (2002-2013?)

Youth literature
 Inky Awards

Children's books
Defunct awards
Australian Multicultural Children's Literature Awards, awarded by the Office of Multicultural Affairs from 1991 to 1995, and endorsed by the Children's Book Council of Australia.

Ongoing awards
 Children's Book Council of Australia awards
Australian Children's Choice Awards
 Books I Love Best Yearly (BILBY Awards) — CBCA Queensland Branch
 Canberra's Own Outstanding List (COOL Awards) — CBCA ACT Branch
Children's Book of the Year Awards
 Early Childhood
 Younger Readers
 Older Readers
 Picture Book of the Year
 New Illustrator (2019–
Eve Pownall Award for Information Books
 Crichton Award for Children's Book Illustration (1988–2018)
 Dame Annabelle Rankin Award
 Leila St John Award
 Nan Chauncy Award
Children's Peace Literature Award
 Dromkeen Medal
Environment Award for Children's Literature, awarded by the Wilderness Society
Speech Pathology Australia Book of the Year Awards

History 
 Australian History Awards
 Chief Minister's Northern Territory Book History Awards
 Ernest Scott Prize
 New South Wales Premier's History Awards (1997–)
 Prime Minister's Prize for Australian History (2007–)
 Victorian Community History Awards (1998–)

Science fiction, horror, and other speculative fiction 
 Aurealis Award
 Australian Shadows Award
 Chandler Award
 Ditmar Award

Crime writing 
 Davitt Award
 CWA Duncan Laurie Dagger Awards
 Ned Kelly Awards

Non-fiction
 ACT Writing and Publishing Awards
 Educational Publishing Awards Australia
 The Bragg UNSW Press Prize for Science Writing
Hazel Rowley Literary Fellowship
 The Iremonger Award (2004–2008)
 National Biography Award (1996–)
 Peter Blazey Fellowship
 Walkley Book Award
 Whitley Awards (Australia)

Other
 Barbara Ramsden Award (Fiction or Nonfiction)
 Nib Literary Award (Fiction or Nonfiction)
 Russell Prize (Humour)

See also 

 Australian literature
 Commonwealth Writers Prize
 List of literary awards
 List of years in Australian literature

Notes

Awards
 
Australian literary